Daraundi A Hydropower Station (or Daraudi A) is a 6 MW run-of-river hydro-electric plant located on the Daraundi River in the Gorkha District of Nepal.

Location and water source

The project is located in the former Muchok, Takumajh Lakuribot and Saurpani VDCs of Gorkha District.
The flow from Daraundi River is used to generate 6 MW electricity. 

Construction

Nil Tara Pvt. Ltd. conducted the feasibility study for the Daraudi-A Hydroelectric project.
Orient Consult Pvt. Ltd. reviewed and revised the study, including changing the headrace canal to a tunnel and revisions to the layout.
The revised design would give installed capacity of 6.5 MW and would deliver 35.51 GWh per year.

Kalika Construction began work in July 2013.
In December 2013 the project director reported that work had begun on the intake structure, sedimentation site and office camp, and expected completion within one and a half years.
About 200 people were employed on the project.
The target for completion was July 2015, but delays were caused by earthquakes and blockages.
On 8 September 2016 the project began trial electricity generation.
The plant started delivering electricity from 2073-08-12 BS (28 October 2016).
It was inaugurated by Pushpa Kamal Dahal (Prachanda), former prime minister of Nepal.

Technical

It was designed to discharge .

There is a  canal siphon at Sota/Jhyalla Khola and a  pipe siphon at Chainage.

The powerhouse is in Chanaute.
A  penstock pipe with diameter  leads from the forebay to the powerhouse.
The power station holds two horizontal axis Francis turbines with rated capacity  connected to two generators with capacity 3.2 MW.
From the switch yard the power is transmitted over a  33kV single circuit line to the Gorkha substation.

Impact

It was assumed that the Daraundu hydropower project and dam would obstruct migration of fish and severely reduce their population.
Three households were relocated.
The project reduced water available for irrigation at some sites, causing much resentment by farmers.
The farmers at Daraundi A expected road improvements and an electricity supply from the project, but received neither.
The project developers stated that these things were the responsibility of the government.

Ownership and finance

The plant is developed and partially owned by Daraundi Kalika Hydro, an Independent Power Producer.
As of 2018 the company was listed in a World Bank report as being one of the hydropower companies operating after 2010 that had not issued local shares.
The main investor is Global IME Bank.

The project cost Rs 1.30 billion.
Pricing would be Rs8.4 per kilowatt hour in the dry season, and Rs4.8 per kilowatt hour in the wet season.
A ten year payback was expected.
The generation licence will expire in 2104-02-15 BS, after which the plant will be handed over to the government.  The power station is connected to the national grid and the electricity is sold to Nepal Electricity Authority.

See also

List of power stations in Nepal

References

Sources

Hydroelectric power stations in Nepal
Gravity dams
Run-of-the-river power stations
Dams in Nepal
Irrigation in Nepal
2016 establishments in Nepal
Buildings and structures in Gorkha District